Tigrane is an opera by Johann Adolph Hasse to a libretto by an anonymous arranger following Francesco Silvani which had already been used Vivaldi for his own opera of the same name.	The opera premiered 4 November 1729 at the Teatro San Bartolomeo,	Naples.

Recordings
"Solca il mar" Max Emanuel Cenčić on Rokoko - Hasse arias Armonia Atenea George Petrou Decca 2014
"Solca il mar e nel periglio" Sonia Prina on Baroque Divas Armonia Atenea George Petrou Decca 2015 ( note: "Fra quest’ombre" Vivica Genaux is mislabeled on the recording as from Tigrane, but is actually from the opera Solimano.)

References

1729 operas
Operas by Johann Adolf Hasse
Operas